Glen L. Taggart (1914-1997) was the  second Vice Chancellor of the University of Nigeria, Nsukka and the only American that has headed the institution (1964 – 1966) and whose approach was that of respect to the respective culture of the host University rather than modeling it rigidly after the American style. He was also the 11th president of  Utah State University from 1968 to 1979.

References 

1914 births
1997 deaths
American academic administrators
Presidents of Utah State University
Vice-Chancellors of the University of Nigeria
American expatriate academics
American expatriates in Nigeria
20th-century American academics